Tom Tom Tomcat is a 1953 Warner Bros. Merrie Melodies animated short directed by Friz Freleng. The short was released on June 27, 1953, and stars Tweety and Sylvester.

Plot
In the Wild West, Granny and Tweety are riding through the desert in their wagon and singing "Oh! Susanna", when they are ambushed by a large group of "puddy tats" as Indians (many of whom appear to be clones of Sylvester). They flee to a deserted fort, where Granny begins to shoot them down while Tweety counts ("Ten Little Indians"). The tenth one nearly takes Tweety, but is struck down by Granny just in time.

More attempts include an archer and a battering ram, both foiled. One archer almost drags Tweety out again ("Granny! Help! A Mohican got me!") but Granny surprises him with a bomb instead. The cats' attempts continue like this, all of them backfiring or being foiled; usually the cats are blown up or shot. In one instance, Chief Rain-In-The-P-P-Puss orders the actual Sylvester to sneak into the fort; Sylvester emerges later with the top of his head having been scalped off by Granny ("Ya got any more bright ideas?").

Finally, Granny and Tweety disguise themselves as a fellow Indian, and lead the cats into the powder house. When one asks for a match, they kindly oblige, and the powder house explodes, causing all the cats to erupt into the sky and then fall. "Oh my goodness," Tweety comments, "it's raining putty cats!"

See also
 List of cartoons featuring Sylvester

References

External links
 

1953 films
1953 short films
1953 comedy films
1953 animated films
1950s Western (genre) comedy films
1950s Warner Bros. animated short films
Merrie Melodies short films
Sylvester the Cat films
Tweety films
Animated films about birds
Films about Native Americans
Films set in 1890
Short films directed by Friz Freleng
Films scored by Carl Stalling
Warner Bros. Cartoons animated short films
1950s English-language films
Films set in deserts